Bardonia was a station on the Erie Railroad in Bardonia, New York. It was originally built along the New Jersey and New York Railroad's New City Branch, which was later incorporated into the Erie Railroad system. Rather than construct a station at Bardonia, the railroad rented a local entrepreneur's three-story general store for $50–$60 (1916 USD).

Both pedestrian and freight service ended on the New City Branch in 1939, and the tracks were removed soon thereafter. The old station house remained intact near the corner of Bardonia Road and NY 304 until 2014, when it was demolished and replaced by a CVS Pharmacy.

History 
The idea of a railroad between Nanuet and the hamlet of New City, began on May 23, 1871 when the Nanuet and New City Railroad Company filed articles of association. This railroad, a  branch of the New Jersey and New York Railroad, began construction between 1872 and 1874. The railroad, an intended extension to Stony Point, came into existence when the New Jersey and New York took a different route via Spring Valley.

During construction of the railroad, the right-of-way proceeded near the property of John Bardon, a local brewer from Bavaria. Bardon, finding out that the railroad would be passing through, built a new store along the railroad. In doing so, he also offered the railroad a waiting room for a new railroad stop. Bardon's son, Henry, took part in his father's business and when the railroad opened in May 1875, became station agent. At the time, the station was known as Bardon's Station. Despite construction completing on March 11, 1874, the first official train between Nanuet and New City began on May 3, 1875.

Bibliography

References

External links 

Former Erie Railroad stations
Railway stations in Rockland County, New York
Railway stations closed in 1939
Railway stations in the United States opened in 1875
Former railway stations in New York (state)
1875 establishments in New York (state)
1939 disestablishments in New York (state)